Rebecca Eliza Gonzales (born May 19, 1963) is an American diplomat who serves as the director of the Office of Foreign Missions since 2022. She served as the United States ambassador to Lesotho from 2018 to 2022.

Early life and education 

Gonzales was born on May 19, 1963 in Sumter, South Carolina. She earned a Bachelor of Arts and a Master of Business Administration from the George Washington University and a Master of Science from the Dwight D. Eisenhower School for National Security and Resource Strategy at Fort Lesley J. McNair.

Career 

Gonzales is a career member of the Senior Foreign Service; she has been a diplomat since 1992. Gonzales has served diplomatic assignments in Panama City, Athens, Bogotá, New Delhi, Riyadh, Gaborone, and Pretoria. She previously served as chief of staff of the Bureau of Administration at the United States Department of State. 

On September 7, 2017, President Donald Trump announced Gonzales as the nominee to serve as the United States ambassador to Lesotho. On November 1, 2017, a hearing on her nomination was held before the Senate Foreign Relations Committee, and her nomination was reported out of committee on November 14, 2017. On November 16, 2017, her nomination was confirmed in the Senate by voice vote.

On August 4, 2021, President Joe Biden announced his intent to nominate Gonzales to serve as the director of the Office of Foreign Missions. On September 13, 2021, her nomination was sent to the Senate. On March 15, 2022, a hearing on her was held before the Senate Foreign Relations Committee and she was reported out of committee on March 23. On May 19, 2022, her nomination was confirmed in the Senate by voice vote. She assumed office on May 31, 2022.

Personal life
Gonzales speaks Spanish and Greek.

References

1963 births
Living people
20th-century American diplomats
21st-century American diplomats
21st-century American women
Ambassadors of the United States to Lesotho
American women ambassadors
Directors of the Office of Foreign Missions
Dwight D. Eisenhower School for National Security and Resource Strategy alumni
George Washington University alumni
People from Sumter, South Carolina
Trump administration personnel
United States Foreign Service personnel
American women diplomats
Biden administration personnel